Chauncey DePew Burkam (October 13, 1892 – May 9, 1964) was a pinch hitter in Major League Baseball. He played one game for the St. Louis Browns in 1915 and struck out in his only at bat.

References

External links

1892 births
1964 deaths
St. Louis Browns players
Baseball players from Michigan
People from Benton Harbor, Michigan